Atsumi Yashima (born 28 June 1975) is a Japanese former long-distance runner who competed in track and cross country running.

Yashima received her first international medal at the 1994 World Junior Championships in Athletics, where she placed third in the women's 1500 metres closely behind Anita Weyermann and Marta Domínguez. She entered the senior ranks the following year and led the Japanese team to victory at the 1995 Asian Cross Country Championships, with Yashima and her team mates Michiko Shimizu and Yasuko Kimura sweeping the podium at the event on home turf in Chiba. This performance earned her selection for the 1995 IAAF World Cross Country Championships, where she finished 69th overall.

She won her first national title at the Japan Championships in Athletics in 1995, topping the podium in the 5000 metres with a time of 15:14.77 minutes, which was a Japanese record for the event. Yashima was chosen to represent Japan in the 5000 m at the 1995 World Championships in Athletics, but she failed to maintain her level of performance and was eliminated in the first round after finishing sixth in a slow, tactical heat.

Yashima also represented her country in ekiden road relays, winning on two occasions: she won her leg at the International Chiba Ekiden in 1994 and finished second in her leg of the 1995 Beijing International Women's Ekiden. She did not compete again at a high level after the 1995 season.

International competitions

National titles
Japan Championships in Athletics
5000 metres: 1995

See also
List of 5000 metres national champions (women)

References

External links

1975 births
Living people
Japanese female long-distance runners
Japanese female middle-distance runners
World Athletics Championships athletes for Japan
Japan Championships in Athletics winners
20th-century Japanese women
21st-century Japanese women